Kjell Jonevret (born 28 June 1962) is a Swedish football coach and a former player.

Managerial career
Jonevret managed Djurgårdens IF between 2004 and 2006. During his time in Djurgården, he led his team to the double, winning both the Allsvenskan and the Swedish cup in 2005.

He was hired as the manager for Molde FK in December 2006, but left the club in August 2010 

Jonevret was appointed manager of South African team Orlando Pirates in February 2017 and resigned in August 2017 amid speculation he was about to be replaced.

Managerial statistics

Honours

As a player
AIK
Svenska cupen: 1984–85

Viking FK
Norwegian football cup: 1989

As a manager
Djurgårdens IF: 
 Allsvenskan: 2005
 Svenska Cupen: 2005

Molde FK
Norwegian football cup runner-up: 2009
Tippeligaen runner-up: 2009

Individual 
 Swedish Manager of the Year: 2005

References

Living people
1962 births
Swedish footballers
Swedish football managers
IF Brommapojkarna players
AIK Fotboll players
Viking FK players
Vasalunds IF players
Eliteserien players
Västerås SK Fotboll managers
AFC Eskilstuna managers
Djurgårdens IF Fotboll managers
Molde FK managers
Viking FK managers
Swedish expatriate football managers
Expatriate footballers in Norway
Swedish expatriate sportspeople in Norway
Expatriate football managers in Norway
Eliteserien managers
AIK Fotboll non-playing staff
Association football forwards
Swedish expatriate footballers
Orlando Pirates F.C. managers
Expatriate soccer managers in South Africa
Swedish expatriate sportspeople in South Africa
Footballers from Stockholm